Silverio Pérez (20 June 1915 — 2 September 2006) was a Mexican matador whose nickname was "The Pharaoh."

Life

Pérez began his career in 1931, after his brother, Carmelo Pérez, was gored during a bullfight in Mexico by a bull named "Michin"  from the ganaderia San Diego de los Padres He died weeks later in Spain as a consequence of that wound.

Pérez died at his ranch in Pentecostes, east of Mexico City, of pneumonia.

References
 Staff and Wire Reports. (2006, September 10). Silverio Perez, 91; Mexican Matador Known as 'Pharaoh'. The Los Angeles Times

1915 births
2006 deaths
Mexican bullfighters
Social leaders